Lemon Tree Passage is a suburb of the Port Stephens local government area in the Hunter Region of New South Wales, Australia, located at the end of the Tilligerry Peninsula and surrounded by the waters of Port Stephens. At the 2021 census it had a population of 2,686. It is a haven for koalas due to it being densely wooded. The town has a small marina and the local industry is oyster farming.

The suburb is separated from nearby Bulls Island by a small strait which is also known as Lemon Tree Passage.

Lemon Tree Passage has been the focus of an urban legend that states that if a motorist speeds down Lemon Tree Passage Road, they will experience supernatural phenomena. This urban legend provided the focus for the 2013 horror/thriller film Lemon Tree Passage.

The Bureau of Meteorology maintain a monitoring station which includes a Weather radar in the high forested area.

History 
The Worimi people are the traditional occupiers of the Port Stephens area.

It was subdivided in 1962 and had only 30 residents in 1931.

Notes

References

Suburbs of Port Stephens Council